Peddavangara  is a mandal in Mahabubabad district, Telangana, India.

External links
 Real estate boom in peddavnagaraOn villageinfo.in

Mahabubabad district
Mahabubabad